Cynthia Lynn Coffman (born January 19, 1962) is an American serial killer convicted in the 1986 deaths of two women in California. She was convicted along with her boyfriend, James Marlow. Coffman admits to committing the murders but insists she suffered from battered woman syndrome. She was sentenced to death and is sitting on death row in Central California Women's Facility.

Background
She was born in St. Louis, Missouri. After her father left her family, she was raised by her mother. Coffman's mother attempted to give her and her brothers away at one point. By age 18, Coffman married and became a mother, but the marriage did not last long. She moved to Arizona with a friend and met Marlow shortly after he was released from jail. They began to use methamphetamine together, got married, and began to commit violent crimes.

Crimes

Coffman and Marlow were accused of kidnapping and killing four women in October and November 1986. 

 Sandra Neary (32) on Oct. 11, 1986 from Costa Mesa, California
 Pamela Simmons (35) on Oct. 28, 1986 from  Bullhead City, Arizona
 Corinna Novis (20) on Nov. 7, 1986 from Redlands, California
 Lynel Murray (19) on Nov. 12, 1986 from Huntington Beach, California

They were arrested on November 14, 1986, following which Coffman confessed to the murders. Coffman's attorneys say that she loved Marlow but that he battered, brainwashed, and starved her, so she did not run from Marlow when the crime spree began.

Trial and punishment
They were put on trial in July 1989 and 1990 sentenced to death. Coffman was the first woman to receive a death sentence in California since the reinstatement of the death penalty in that state in 1977. A trial in 1992 convicted her of another murder, for which she received a sentence of life imprisonment.

See also 
 List of death row inmates in the United States
 List of serial killers in the United States
 List of women on death row in the United States

References

1962 births
1986 murders in the United States
20th-century American criminals
American female serial killers
American prisoners sentenced to death
American prisoners sentenced to life imprisonment
Criminals from Missouri
Living people
People convicted of murder by California
People from St. Louis
Prisoners sentenced to death by California
Prisoners sentenced to life imprisonment by California
Violence against women in the United States
Women sentenced to death
Criminal duos